Halperin (sometimes spelled as Halparin) is a variation of the Jewish surname Heilprin. Both forms are Southern Yiddish for Heilbrun, that is the German city Heilbronn. The name is sometimes transliterated into the Cyrillic alphabet as Galperin. In Russia the pronunciation of an 'h' was difficult and pronounced as 'g' .

The German form of the Jewish surname is Heilbronn.

Notable people with this surname include:

Elchonon Halpern, (1921- 2015), Grand Rabbi of Golders Green.  In Hebrew spelt  היילפרין, literally pronounced 'Heilprin'

 Bertrand Halperin, American theoretical physicist
 David M. Halperin (born 1952), American theorist in gender studies, queer theory and other fields
 Donald Halperin (1945–2006), New York politician
 Emmanuel Halperin, (born 1943), Israeli media personality
 Ian Halperin (born 1964), Canadian investigative journalist, writer and documentary filmmaker
 Israel Halperin, Canadian academic
 Isser Halperin, later Isser Harel (1912–2003), spymaster of the intelligence and the security services of Israel
 James L. Halperin (born 1952), American author and businessman
 Mark Halperin (born 1965), American political analyst
 Maurice Halperin (1906–95), American writer, professor and diplomat
 Michel Halpérin, Swiss lawyer and politician
 Monte Halparin, later Monty Hall (1921–2017), American game show host
 Morton Halperin (born 1938), American expert on foreign policy and civil liberties
 Robert Halperin (1928–85), American yachtsman, football player, and businessman
 Samara Halperin, American artist
 Sol Halperin (1902-1977), American special effects artist
 Tamar Halperin (born 1976), Israeli harpsichordist, pianist and musicologist
 Tulio Halperin Donghi (1926-2014), Argentine historian
 Uzziel Halperin, later Uzzi Ornan (born 1923), Israeli linguist
 Victor Halperin (1895–1983), American film director, producer, and writer
 Yotam Halperin (born 1984), Israeli basketball player

See also
 Galperin, a list of people with the surname
 Gelperin, a list of people with the surname
 Eleonora Yakovlevna Galperina, better known as Nora Gal (1912–91), Soviet writer and translator
 Revekka Galperina (1894–1974), Soviet editor and translator
 Halpern
 
 

Jewish surnames
Yiddish-language surnames